Teeuwen is a Dutch patronymic surname. Teeuw, Teeuwes, Tewis, Theeuwis etc. are archaic short forms of the given name Matthew/Mattheus. The surname has many variant forms, including Tewes and Theeuwes. People with the surname include.

David Teeuwen (1970–2015), American editor and journalist 
Hans Teeuwen (born 1967), Dutch comedian, musician, actor and filmmaker
Ingrid Teeuwen (born 1981), Dutch weightlifter
Justin Teeuwen (born 1995), Dutch badminton player
Margje Teeuwen (born 1974), Dutch field hockey midfielder
Mark Teeuwen (born 1966), Dutch academic and Japanologist
Variant forms
Andries Teeuw (1921–2012), Dutch critic of Indonesian literature
Anouk Teeuwe (born 1975), Dutch singer-songwriter and record producer known as Anouk
Arjen Teeuwissen (born 1971), Dutch equestrian
Len Teeuws (1927–2006), American football player
Fred Teeven ((born 1958), Dutch VVD politician

References

Dutch-language surnames
Patronymic surnames